Ernst Levy (23 December 1881 – 14 September 1968) was a German American legal scholar and historian of law. He was a Professor of Roman Law at the Goethe University Frankfurt (1919–1928) and the University of Heidelberg (1928–1935). Being Jewish, he was forced to retire in 1935, and decided to emigrate from Nazi Germany to the United States. At the University of Washington, he was a Professor of Law and History from 1937 to 1952.

Born in Berlin, Levy studied law at the University of Freiburg and the Humboldt University of Berlin, earning his doctorate under Emil Seckel in 1906. He briefly worked at the Amtsgericht in Oranienburg, and served in World War I, before earning a professorship in Frankfurt. Due to the Nuremberg Laws he had to retire in 1935, and then moved to the United States.

References

Further reading

Robert L. Taylor (1952). "Dr. Ernst Levy", Washington Law Review, 27:3, pp. 173–175 (full text online at https://digitalcommons.law.uw.edu/cgi/viewcontent.cgi?article=2899&context=wlr)

External links

Ernst Levy on Geni.com

1881 births
1968 deaths
Jurists from Berlin
American people of German-Jewish descent
Jewish emigrants from Nazi Germany to the United States
Humboldt University of Berlin alumni
University of Washington faculty
Academic staff of Goethe University Frankfurt
Academic staff of Heidelberg University
German military personnel of World War I